Barry Christopher Knestout (born June 11, 1962) is an American prelate of the Roman Catholic Church. Knestout has been serving as the 13th bishop of the Diocese of Richmond in Virginia since 2017.

Previously, Knestout served as the priest secretary for Cardinal James Hickey and then-Cardinal Theodore McCarrick.  Knestout also served as an auxiliary bishop of the Archdiocese of Washington, assisting Cardinal Donald Wuerl.

Biography

Early life 
Barry Knestout was born in Cheverly, Maryland, on June 11, 1962, to Thomas and Caroline Knestout. Thomas was a deacon who served as a cryptologist for the National Security Agency and as the director of the Office of the Permanent Diaconate for the Archdiocese of Washington. One of nine children, Barry Knestout has five brothers and three sisters. A younger brother, Mark Knestout, is a priest in the Archdiocese of Washington.

As a child, Barry Knestout lived with his family in Ankara, Turkey, for four years.  On returning to the United States, he attended St. Pius X School and Bowie Senior High School, both in Bowie, Maryland Knestout then studied at the University of Maryland in College Park, Maryland, obtaining a Bachelor of Architecture degree in 1984. In 1985, Knestout entered Mount St. Mary's Seminary in Emmitsburg, Maryland, earning a Master of Divinity degree in 1988 and a Master of Theology degree in moral theology in 1989.

Priesthood 
Knestout was ordained to the priesthood for the Archdiocese of Washington by Cardinal James Hickey on June 24, 1989. After his ordination, Knestout served as associate pastor at St. Bartholomew Parish in Bethesda, Maryland until 1993 and at St. Peter Parish in Waldorf, Maryland from 1993 to 1994. Knestout was named priest-secretary to Cardinal Hickey in 1994, serving him until his death in 2004; Knestout also served as priest-secretary for McCarrick from 2003 to 2004.

Knestout was raised by the Vatican to the rank of monsignor in 1999, and served as executive director of the archdiocesan office of youth ministry from 2001 to 2003. He was appointed pastor of St. John the Evangelist Parish in Silver Spring, Maryland in 2004, and archdiocesan secretary for pastoral life and social concerns in 2006. In April 2007, Knestout was named vicar general and moderator of the curia of the archdiocese.

Knestout co-chaired the Papal Visit Planning Committee in 2008, overseeing many preparations for Pope Benedict XVI's 2008 visit to the United States.  In planning the papal visit, Knestout collaborated with his brother, Mark, who was director of the archdiocese Office of Worship at the time.  Barry Knestout ran a contest for architecture students at the Catholic University of America to design the altar and chair for the pope to use when celebrating mass at Nationals Park in Washington, D.C. Knestout later received a Holy Cross Pro Ecclesia et Pontifice for his work on the visit.

Auxiliary Bishop of Washington 

On November 18, 2008, Knestout was appointed titular bishop of Leavenworth and an auxiliary bishop for the Archdiocese of Washington by Benedict XVI. He was consecrated on December 29 by Archbishop Donald Wuerl, with Bishops Francisco Valer, and Martin Holley serving as co-consecrators, at the Cathedral of St. Matthew the Apostle in Washington, D.C.. Knestout was the first native of Prince George's County in Maryland to serve as a bishop for the archdiocese.

Bishop of Richmond
On December 5, 2017, Knestout was appointed the 13th bishop of the Diocese of Richmond by Pope Francis. He was installed on January 12, 2018, at the Cathedral of the Sacred Heart in Richmond.

On June 31, 2018, following McCarrick's resignation from the college of cardinals, Knestout denied knowledge of any sexual abuse allegations against McCarrick while serving as his priest-secretary:  My first assignment was in 2001 while still serving as priest-secretary to Cardinal James A. Hickey. I was asked to also assist as priest-secretary to his successor, Cardinal McCarrick for six months. Despite the double assignment during those six months, most of my time was spent with the elderly Cardinal Hickey – with whom I worked for nearly a decade. In 2003, I was assigned to the Chancery for a year as one of two priest-secretaries at the time for Cardinal McCarrick as his appointment scheduler. During that year, Cardinal McCarrick traveled frequently in his work with Catholic Relief Services (CRS) and in his other duties as Cardinal.Knestout released a list in February 2019 of 42 priests from the diocese who were facing credible accusations of sexual abuse of minors. On May 10, 2020, Knestout suspended Mark White, a diocese priest in two parishes, for violation of canon law.  White had been writing a blog that accused Knestout, Pope Francis and the church hierarchy of covering up McCarrick's crimes.  In 2019, Knestout had ordered White to stop writing the blog.  When White resumed it later in 2019, Knestout obtained a trespass order barring him from church properties in the two parishes.  In June 2020, White's petition to the Congregation for Clergy in Rome to remain in his parishes was rejected.

On October 22, 2020, Knestout announced a $6.3 million settlement to 51 people who were sexually abused as children by clergy from the diocese.  He also established the Independent Reconciliation Program to help the healing of the victims.

See also

 Catholic Church hierarchy
 Catholic Church in the United States
 Historical list of the Catholic bishops of the United States
 List of Catholic bishops of the United States
 Lists of patriarchs, archbishops, and bishops

References

External links
 Roman Catholic Diocese of Richmond Official Site

 

1962 births
Living people
People from Cheverly, Maryland
21st-century American Roman Catholic titular bishops
University of Maryland, College Park alumni
Mount St. Mary's University alumni
Roman Catholic Archdiocese of Washington
Roman Catholic bishops in Washington, D.C.
Religious leaders from Maryland
Catholics from Maryland